The 2020–21 Russian Premier League（known as the Tinkoff Russian Premier League, also written as Tinkoff Russian Premier Liga for sponsorship reasons）was the 29th season of the premier football competition in Russia since the dissolution of the Soviet Union and the 17th under the current Russian Premier League name.

Teams
As in the previous season, 16 teams are playing in the 2020–21 season. After the 2019–20 season, Orenburg and Krylia Sovetov were relegated to the 2020–21 Russian Football National League. Both return to the second tier after a two-year stay in the top tier. They were replaced by Rotor and Khimki, the winners and runners up of the 2019–20 Russian Football National League. Rotor Volgograd returned to the Premier League after a 16-year absence, while Khimki returned after an 11-year absence.

Venues

Personnel and kits

Managerial changes

Tournament format and regulations

Basic
The 16 teams were playing a round-robin tournament whereby each team plays each one of the other teams twice, once at home and once away. Thus, a total of 240 matches was played, with 30 matches played by each team.

Promotion and relegation
The teams that finish 15th and 16th will be relegated to the FNL 2021–22, while the top 2 in that league will be promoted to the 2021–22 season.

The 13th and 14th Premier League teams will play the 4th and 3rd FNL 2020–21 teams respectively in two (home-and-away) playoff games with the winners securing Premier League spots for the 2021–22 season. In case one of the Premier League teams that finish 13th and 14th will not pass licensing for the 2021–22 Premier League season, the other Premier League club will remain in the league, and the 3rd and 4th FNL teams will play each other in a two games playoff for the remaining spot. In case one of the FNL teams that finish 3rd and 4th will not pass licensing for the 2021–22 Premier League season, the team that finished Premier League in 13th place will remain in the league, and the team that finished 14th will play the FNL team that passed licensing in a two game playoffs, with the winner securing the Premier League spot. In case only two of the clubs otherwise eligible for the playoffs pass licensing for the 2020–21 season, the playoffs will not be held and the clubs that passed licensing will get the Premier League spots. In case any teams otherwise eligible for the 2021–22 Premier League (including the top 2 2020–21 FNL clubs) will not pass licensing or will be unable to participate in the season for any other reason, the spots will be passed on to the teams that lost in the playoffs, in order of their 2020–21 league position, with the Premier League positions considered higher than FNL positions (for example, if 13th Premier League team and 3rd FNL team lose in the playoffs, the spot will go to the 13th Premier League team). If, after following these procedures, there are still 2021–22 Premier League spots available (in case 3 or more teams otherwise qualified are unable to participate), the remaining replacements will be chosen by the Russian Football Union with agreement of the Premier League and FNL.

2nd and 4th FNL teams (FC Orenburg and FC Alania Vladikavkaz) failed licensing for the 2021–22 Premier League season (due to lack of acceptable stadium), their appeal was denied on 12 May 2021. On 15 May 2021, Russian Football Union confirmed that the relegation playoffs will not be held. RFU also amended the playoff regulations accordingly. If the original version of the regulations was followed to the letter, FC Nizhny Novgorod would have faced FC Arsenal Tula in a home-and-away playoff series, and then the loser of the series would be promoted into the Premier League anyway, rendering the playoffs meaningless.

Season events
On 13 September 2020, the league cancelled the game between FC Rotor Volgograd and FC Krasnodar due to more than 7 positive COVID-19 tests among the Rotor players and staff. On 16 September 2020, Russian Football Union assigned a 3–0 victory to Krasnodar. On 18 September 2020, the league cancelled the game between FC Rostov and Rotor originally scheduled for 19 September due to continuing positive virus tests at Rotor. On 22 September 2020, Russian Football Union assigned a 3–0 victory to Rostov.

League table

Results

Positions by round
The table lists the positions of teams after each week of matches. In order to preserve chronological evolvements, any postponed matches are not included to the round at which they were originally scheduled, but added to the full round they were played immediately afterwards.

Season statistics

Top goalscorers

Top assists

Season awards

Russian Football Union awards
On 15 July 2021, Russian Football Union named its list of 33 top players:

Goalkeepers
 Yury Dyupin (Rubin)
 Ilya Lantratov (Khimki)
 Igor Akinfeev (CSKA)

Right backs
 Mário Fernandes (CSKA)
 Vyacheslav Karavayev (Zenit)
 Dmitri Rybchinsky (Lokomotiv)

Right-centre backs
 Vedran Ćorluka (Lokomotiv)
 Dejan Lovren (Zenit)
 Samuel Gigot (Spartak)

Left-centre backs
 Yaroslav Rakitskiy (Zenit)
 Georgi Dzhikiya (Spartak)
 Pablo (Lokomotiv)

Left backs
 Douglas Santos (Zenit)
 Ilya Samoshnikov (Rubin)
 Ayrton (Spartak)

Right midfielders
 Denis Makarov (Rubin)
 Malcom (Zenit)
 Wanderson (Krasnodar)

Right central midfielders
 Christian Noboa (Sochi)
 Wilmar Barrios (Zenit)
 Wendel (Zenit)

Left central midfielders
 Grzegorz Krychowiak (Lokomotiv)
 Nikola Vlašić (CSKA)
 Magomed Ozdoyev (Zenit)

Left midfielders
 Khvicha Kvaratskhelia (Rubin)
 Daniil Lesovoy (Dynamo)
 Chidera Ejuke (CSKA)

Right forwards
 Artem Dzyuba (Zenit)
 Đorđe Despotović (Rubin)
 Aleksandr Sobolev (Spartak)

Left forwards
 Sardar Azmoun (Zenit)
 Jordan Larsson (Spartak)
 Fyodor Smolov (Lokomotiv)

Other awards announced by RFU on the same day included:
 Best player: Sardar Azmoun (Zenit)
 Best coach: Sergei Semak (Zenit)
 Best team: FC Zenit Saint Petersburg
 Hope award (Best Under-21 player): Arsen Zakharyan (Dynamo)
 For contribution to football development: Yevgeni Giner (CSKA)

Russian Premier League awards
 Player of the season: Sardar Azmoun (Zenit)
 Coach of the season: Sergei Semak (Zenit)
 Goal of the season: Denis Makarov (Rubin 2–1 Zenit, 8 March 2021)
 Young player of the season: Khvicha Kvaratskhelia (Rubin)
 Goalkeeper of the season: Guilherme (Lokomotiv)

References

External links

Russian Premier League seasons
1
Russian Premier League|Rus